Sludka is a rural locality (a village) in Verkhovskoye Rural Settlement, Tarnogsky District, Vologda Oblast, Russia. The population was 1 as of 2002.

Geography 
Sludka is located 45 km southwest of Tarnogsky Gorodok (the district's administrative centre) by road. Maurnikovskaya is the nearest rural locality.

References 

Rural localities in Tarnogsky District